Pardons for Morant, Handcock and Witton, three Australian soldiers, were sought from their convictions for war crimes - the murder of several Boer prisoners-of-war - during the Second Boer War.

Following four courts martial in early 1902, Lieutenants Peter Joseph Handcock and Harry "Breaker" Morant, of the Bushveldt Carbineers (BVC) of the British Army, were executed by a firing squad of Cameron Highlanders, in Pretoria, South Africa, on 27 February 1902, 18 hours after they had been sentenced. Despite the court recommending mercy in both cases, Lord Kitchener confirmed their death sentences. Kitchener personally signed their death warrants.

Following the court also recommending mercy in his case, the sentence of a third brother officer, Lieutenant George Ramsdale Witton, was commuted to life imprisonment by Lord Kitchener. Following public pressure, Witton was released on 11 August 1904, but never pardoned.

An Australian military lawyer, Commander James William Unkles of the Royal Australian Naval Reserve, sent petitions for pardons for all three men to both Queen Elizabeth II and to the Petitions Committee of the Australian House of Representatives in 2009 but both governments declined them on the basis of insufficient evidence.

Witton petition 
In 1904, a printed petition to King Edward VII was circulated in Australia, for signature by interested parties, requesting clemency in the form of (a) a pardon for George Witton, and (b) the immediate release of Witton from his incarceration. At least one copy of the petition, signed by thirty-seven individuals from the town of Colebrook, Tasmania, is extant.

In 1907, the publication in Australia of Witton's book Scapegoats of the Empire revived debate about the convictions.

Unkles' petitions 
In October 2009, the Australian military lawyer, Commander James William Unkles, of the Royal Australian Naval Reserve, sent petitions for pardons for Morant, Handcock, and Witton to both Queen Elizabeth II and to the Petitions Committee of the Australian House of Representatives.

The first petition was considered by the British Government, on behalf of the Queen—"The petition argued that the convictions were unsafe and that their trial was unfair because the men were denied the right to communicate with the Australian government, refused an opportunity to prepare their cases and blocked from lodging an appeal."—and, in November 2010, the UK Ministry of Defence issued a statement that the appeal had been rejected:

The second petition was considered by the House of Representatives' Petitions Committee at a public hearing on Monday, 15 March 2010. Unkles appeared before the committee, along with others, including the historian Craig Wilcox. On Monday, 27 February 2012, in a speech delivered to the House of Representatives on the 110-year anniversary of the sentencing of the three men, Alex Hawke, M.P. described the case for the pardons as "strong and compelling".

Roxon's rejection
In May 2012, Attorney General Nicola Roxon informed Unkles that the Australian Government would not approach the British Government to seek a pardon for Morant because he, Handcock and Witton did, in fact, kill unarmed Boer prisoners and others. Roxon's letter to Unkles stated that in Australia "a pardon for a Commonwealth offence would generally only be granted where the offender is both morally and technically innocent of the offence". Moreover, her letter stated that "Despite the time that has passed ... I consider seeking a pardon ... could be rightly perceived as glossing over very grave criminal acts".

See also 
 Court-martial of Breaker Morant
 Breaker Morant (play)
 Breaker Morant (film)

References

Further reading 
 Anon, "Execution of Officers: Important Statement by Mr. Barton", Bathurst Free Press and Mining Journal, (Thursday, 3 April 1902), p. 2.
 Anon, "Despatch from Lord Kitchener: Morant, Handcock, and Witton: Charged with Twenty Murders", Bathurst Free Press and Mining Journal, (Monday, 7 April 1902), p. 3.
 'Our London Correspondent', "The Executed Officers: Statement by the War Office", Australian Town and Country Journal, (Saturday, 12 April 1902), p. 13.
 Executed Officers: Detailed Reports of the Trial: Five Main Charges, The Brisbane Courier, (Saturday, 24 May 1902), p. 6.
 'L.', "Australian Military Legislation", The Sydney Morning Herald, (Wednesday, 1 July 1903), p. 5.
 Petition for clemency, pardon, and the immediate release from incarceration of George Ramsdale Witton, addressed to King Edward VII, and signed by 37 citizens of Colebrook, Tasmania, c.1904.
 Witton, G.R., Scapegoats of the Empire, Angus & Robertson, (Sydney), 1907.
 Copeland, H., "A Tragic memory of the Boer War: When Two Australian Officers Were Shot by Lord Kitchener's Orders", The Argus Week-End Magazine, (Saturday, 11 June 1938), p. 6.
 Paterson, A.B. ("Banjo"), "An Execution and a Royal Pardon", The Sydney Morning Herald, (Saturday, 25 February 1939), p. 21.
 Burke, A., "Melodrama of Boer War", The Sydney Morning Herald, (Saturday, 7 August 1954), p. 14.
 "Bartle Frere", "Harry Morant", The Townsville Daily Bulletin, (Friday, 10 December 1954), p. 9.
 "Move to Bring Morant Home", The Canberra Times, (Friday, 26 September 1980), p. 3.
 Standing Committee on Petitions, "Petition regarding the convictions of Morant, Handcock and Witton", House of Representatives, (Canberra), 15 March 2010.
 Wald, T., "Royal pardon for Harry ‘Breaker' Morant rejected by British Government", Herald Sun, 12 November 2010.
 Unkles, J., "Justice has been denied the Breaker for too long", The Sydney Morning Herald, Saturday, 17 December 2010.
 Jean, D., "Fight to Go on to Pardon for Breaker", The Adelaide Advertiser, (Friday, 11 May 2012), p. 39.
 Berkovic, N., "McClelland defies A-G on Morant", The Australian, (Friday, 11 May 2012), p. 3.
 Unkles, James, Ready, Aim, Fire : Major James Francis Thomas, the Fourth Victim in the Execution of Lieutenant Harry "Breaker" Morant, Sid Harta Publishers, (Glen Waverley), 2018. 
 House of Representatives' Grievance Debate: Harry ‘Breaker’ Morant, (speaker Alex Hawle, MP), Monday, 15 March 2010.
 Standing Committee on Petitions, "Petition regarding the convictions of Morant, Handcock and Witton", House of Representatives, (Canberra), 15 March 2010.
 National Boer War Memorial Association: Petition for a Pardon for Lieutenants Morant, Handcock and Witton.
 Australians at War: Boer War: Major Thomas Defended Breaker Morant.
 Personal Histories: Boer War & WW1: James Francis Thomas - The Man Who Defended Breaker Morant.
 NAA: A1336, 227: Copyright Application by George Ramsdale Whitton for Scapegoats of the Empire, dated 7 August 1907, National Archives of Australia, (contains photographs of each of the book's 240 pages).

1902 in case law
1902 in Australian law
Controversies in Australia
Military law
Military discipline
Morant
United Kingdom military law